Ellesmere Rural is a civil parish in Shropshire, England.

In 2011 the parish covered a large area, mainly to the west of the town of Ellesmere. This rural parish consists of farmland and a number of small settlements including Dudleston Heath (also known as Criftins), Dudleston, Elson, Tetchill and Welsh Frankton.

History
In the 1610 translated edition of William Camden's Britannia, this area is described as
Ellesmer a little  but rich and fruitfull

Ellesemere Rural was created in 1894 when the civil functions of the larger ancient parish of Ellesmere were abolished and divided between this parish and the town of Ellsemere, which became a separate civil parish called Ellesmere Urban. Despite several changes to the parish boundary during the twentieth century the parish population has remained relatively stable since the 1930s.

See also
Listed buildings in Ellesmere Rural

References

External links

 Ellesmere Rural Parish Council

Civil parishes in Shropshire